Coenyropsis is a genus of butterflies from the subfamily Satyrinae in the family Nymphalidae.

Species
Coenyropsis bera (Hewitson, 1877)
Coenyropsis carcassoni Kielland, 1976
Coenyropsis natalii (Boisduval, 1847)

External links 
 "Coenyropsis van Son, 1958" at Markku Savela's Lepidoptera and Some Other Life Forms

Satyrini
Butterfly genera